The Berlin derby is the name given to any association football match between two clubs in Berlin, Germany, but has more recently referred to the derby between 1. FC Union Berlin and Hertha BSC.

History

Before reunification
Despite producing more Bundesliga clubs than any other German city, Berlin derbies have been a rarity during the history of the current German top division.

An intense rivalry developed between Tennis Borussia Berlin and Hertha BSC in the 1950s.  A proposal for a merger between the two clubs in 1958 was resoundingly rejected, with only three of the 266 members voting in favour. However, the pair did not meet in the Bundesliga until the 1970s. Hertha BSC also held a rivalry with SC Tasmania 1900 Berlin. SC Tasmania 1900 Berlin unexpectedly played one season in the Bundesliga in 1965–66 season. However, there were no Berlin derbies during the season. Hertha BSC had been relegated because of rule breaches and SC Tasmania 1900 Berlin was granted promotion as its replacement, in order to still have a representative for Berlin in the Bundesliga. The rivalry was mostly one-sided on the part of SC Tasmania 1900 Berlin, but still lives on through its successor club SV Tasmania Berlin.

The first Berlin derby in the Bundesliga took place between Hertha BSC  and Tennis Borussia Berlin at the Olympiastadion on 16 November 1974. Hertha BSC had the privilege of playing at its home ground despite being the designated away team and won the match 3–0. Hertha BSC then completed the double over Tennis Borussia Berlin by winning 2–1 at the Olympiastadion on 10 May 1975.  Following the relegation of Tennis Borussia Berlin at the end of the 1974–75 Bundesliga season, the pair did not meet again until 13 November 1976. Hertha won the match 2–0. The pair then met for a final time in the 1976–77 Bundesliga on 16 April 1977. Tennis Borussia Berlin  won the match 2-1 and thus achieved its sole victory against the Die Alte Dame 2–1. All meetings between the pair were hosted at the Olympiastadion.

Three Berlin clubs were involved in the 1985–86 2. Bundesliga a decade later: Hertha BSC and Tennis Borussia Berlin, who had both relegated from the Bundsliga, and Blau-Weiß 1890 Berlin who had won the 1984-85 Oberliga Berlin. Blau-Weiß 1890 Berlin finished the 1985-86 2. Bundesligas as runners-up and qualified for its first season in the Bundesliga in its history. Plans for another merger involving Hertha BSC had been drawn up with Tennis Borussia Berlin, Blau-Weiß 1890 Berlin and SC Charlottenburg a few years prior in 1982. However, the plan that was nicknamed "FC Utopia" by critics ultimately failed.

Meanwhile, in East Berlin, derbies were more commonplace in the top division. The major clubs in East Berlin were FC Vorwärts Berlin, BFC Dynamo and 1. FC Union Berlin. FC Vorwärts Berlin and BFC Dynamo were associated with the armed organs, while 1. FC Union Berlins was a "civilian club". The clubs would meet numerous times in the DDR-Oberliga. All three clubs competed simultaneously in the 1966-67 DDR-Oberliga, 1968-69 DDR-Oberliga and 1970-71 DDR-Oberliga.

  ASK Vorwärts Berlin was the strongest football team in East Berlin in the late 1950s and 1960s. The club was originally founded as SV VP Vorwärts Leipzig in Leipzig 1951. It was relocated to East Berlin in 1953, to increase the military profile in the capital. The team played its home matches at the Friedrich-Ludwig-Jahn-Sportpark in Prenzlauer Berg. ASK Vorwärts Berlin hosted teams such as Wolverhampton Wanderers F.C., Rangers F.C. and Manchester United F.C. in the European competitions in the 1960s. The club even had a small  following in West Berlin before the construction of the Berlin Wall. The football department of ASK Vorwärts Berlin was separated from the sports club and reorganized as football club FC Vorwärts Berlin on 18 January 1966. The club was able to recruit talents from all army sports communities (ASG) in East Germany. It was also able to recruit talented players from other clubs that had been called up for military service with the National People's Army. The club won 6 titles in the DDR-Oberliga and two titles in the FDGB-Pokal before it was relocated to Frankfurt an der Oder in 1971.

The football team of SG Dynamo Dresden was relocated to East Berlin in 1954. The team and its place in the DDR-Oberliga were transferred to the new sports club SC Dynamo Berlin. The relocation was made for similar reasons as the relocation of SV Vorwärts der KVP Leipzig to East Berlin the year before. The relocation was designed to provide the capital with a team that could rival Hertha BSC, Blau-Weiß 1890 Berlin and Tennis Borussia Berlin, which were still popular in East Berlin and drew football fans to West Berlin. SC Dynamo Berlin had some success in the late 1950s, but would find itself overshadowed by ASK Vorwärts Berlin in the 1960s. SC Dynamo Berlin won the 1959 FDGB-Pokal. However, the team was not allowed to participate in the 1960–61 European Cup Winners' Cup. The German Football Association of the GDR (DFV) instead found local rival and league runners-up ASK Vorwärts Berlin to be a more suitable representative of East Germany in the competition. The football department of SC Dynamo Berlin was separated from the sports club and reorganized as football club BFC Dynamo on 15 January 1966. BFC Dynamo was supported by the Stasi and considered the favorite club of the president of SV Dynamo and head of the Stasi Erich Mielke. The relocation of FC Vorwärts Berlin to Frankfurt an der Oder allowed BFC Dynamo to take its place as the dominant team of the armed organs in East Berlin. BFC Dynamo became one of the designated focus clubs in East German football and would develop a very successful youth academy. The club would eventually be able to draw on talents from training centers (TZ) across East Germany through an extensive scouting network that included numerous training centers (TZ) of SV Dynamo.

BFC Dynamo won ten consecutive titles in the DDR-Oberliga between 1979 and 1988. The club had the best material conditions in the league and the best team by far. Preferential treatment from sports authorities and allegations of sporting misconduct fueled a fierce rivalry with  1. FC Union Berlin. Clashes between supporters of the two clubs regularly broke out at derbies. BFC Dynamo was seen as the supreme representative of the security agencies, with advantages in the recruitment of players and financial support as well as the political clout of Erich Mielke. 1. FC Union Berlin on the other hand was seen as a football club of the working class, confined to struggle the shadow of BFC Dynamo. Supporters of 1. FC Union Berlin cultivated its image as the eternal underdog. An expression of the supporters of 1. FC Union Berlin was: "Better to be a loser than a stupid Stasi-pig". 1. FC Union Berlin became the most popular club in East Berlin.

1. FC Union Berlin would eventually be known for a supporter scene that was anti-establishment. A famous saying was: “Not every Union fan is an enemy of the state, but every enemy of the state is a Union fan". However, politics was not in the foreground. Most supporters of 1. FC Union Berlin were just normal football supporters. Provocations was part of football in East Germany and people sometimes yelled out whatever the knew they could get away with. Supporters of 1. FC Union Berlin saw themselves as stubborn and non-conformist. But this image should not be confused with actual resistance. Some supporters of 1. FC Union Berlin of the era have testified that their support for 1. FC Union Berlin was not based on politics or any act of opposition. The club was the most important thing and the identification with 1. FC Union Berlin had primarily to do with Köpenick. For some, the dissident reputation of 1. FC Union Berlin is a legend that appeared after Die Wende.

The derby between the two clubs was first and foremost a traditional local football rivalry. Both clubs had supporters that were not true to the line. BFC Dynamo was strongest in some parts of East Berlin, while 1. FC Union Berlin was strongest other parts.  The border ran at Alexanderplatz where many fights between the supporters of the two teams were fought. The home boroughs of the two clubs, Hohenschönhausen and Köpenick respectively, were dangerous territories for supporters of the opposing team.

Sympathies between 1. FC Union Berlin and Hertha BSC grew after the separation of East Germany and West Germany. The first personal contacts between  supporters of the two clubs began in the 1970s. Supporters of Hertha BSC visited the Stadion An der Alten Försterei and supporters of 1. FC Union Berlin accompanied the supporters of Hertha BSC when Hertha BSC played in East Germany or the Eastern Bloc countries, such as the quarter finals in the 1978–79 UEFA Cup against Dukla Prague. Chants and slogans such as "Ha-Ho-He, there are only two teams on the Spree - Union and Hertha BSC" and "Hertha and Union - one nation" that emphasized the connection between the two clubs became popular among the two sets of supporters. The two sets of supporters came together for the first time after the opening of the Berlin wall during the first edition of the indoor tournament "Internationales Berliner Hallenfußballturnier" in the Werner-Seelenbinder-Halle on 18–20 January 1990. Supporters of 1. FC Union Berlin and Hertha BSC also sang xenophobic and nationalist chants.

After reunification
On 9 November 1989, the Berlin Wall fell after 28 years of politically, and physically, dividing Berlin. On 27 January 1990, 79 days after the fall of the Berlin Wall, Hertha hosted 1. FC Union Berlin at the Olympiastadion in a friendly in front of 51,270 spectators. Fans of both club's paid for admission in East and West Germany's respective currencies and sang songs of German reunification as Hertha won 2–1. New Hertha signing Axel Kruse opened the scoring at the Olympiastadion in the 13th minute, before 1. FC Union Berlin midfielder  levelled the scores at 1–1 before half-time. Hertha BSC eventually won the tie 2–1, thanks to a long range strike from Dirk Greiser. After reunification, 1. FC Union Berlin were placed into the third tier NOFV-Oberliga Mitte, winning the division in all three seasons it existed. Numerous lower key friendlies followed the historic January 1990 meeting at the Olympiastadion.

In two consecutive seasons at the end of the 1990s, Tennis Borussia Berlin were drawn to face Hertha BSC in the DFB-Pokal, during a period when Hertha were among German's strongest teams but TeBe had also acquired a rich backer and made expensive signings in an effort to climb through the divisions. In their first meeting in 1998, TeBe won 4–2 to progress to the quarter-finals in a surprise result (particularly as Hertha qualified for the UEFA Champions League at the end of the season). In 1999's Round of 32, Hertha battled to a 3–2 victory but required extra time to overcome their neighbours.

Bundesliga era
In May 2009, 1. FC Union Berlin won the 3. Liga, gaining promotion to the 2. Bundesliga. On 8 July 2009, Union and Hertha played in a friendly at the Stadion An der Alten Försterei to celebrate the re-opening of the stadium following a season-long renovation period that saw 2,000 volunteers contribute to the building of the stadium. Hertha won the tie 5–3, in a game where a sense of a rivalry was beginning to develop. Hertha BSC supporter and radio commentator Manfred Sangel recalled “The stadium announcer kept having a go at us and at one of our players.” 1. FC Union Berlin president Dirk Zingler subsequently described the friendship between Hertha and Union as “the love for the mysterious mistress started to crumble“ following the fall of the Berlin Wall. During the 2009–10 Bundesliga season, Hertha BSC were relegated to the 2. Bundesliga.

On 17 September 2010, 1. FC Union Berlin played Hertha BSC in the first-ever competitive meeting between the pair. The tie at the Stadion An der Alten Försterei finished 1–1 in front of 18,432 spectators. The return game at the Olympiastadion, played in front of 74,244, finished 2–1 in favour of 1. FC Union Berlin, with Union Berlin cult hero Torsten Mattuschka scoring the winning free-kick in the 71st minute. By the third competitive meeting between the two, signs that the derby was beginning to turn exclusively into a rivalry more than a friendship were beginning to show. After Hertha BSC's 2–1 win at the Stadion An der Alten Försterei, 1. FC Union Berlin goalscorer Christopher Quiring labelled Hertha's fans Wessis, a semi-derogatory term for West Germans, telling Sport1 "They cheer in our stadium. That makes me puke! You have to digest that first. I don't give a shit about my goal. When the Wessis cheer in our stadium, I get sick". 1. FC Union Berlin manager Uwe Neuhaus subsequently labelled Quiring a "great Unioner".

In May 2019, 1. FC Union Berlin gained promotion to the Bundesliga for the first time in their history. Ahead of the first top-flight Berlin derby in over 40 years, Hertha BSC expressed a desire to play the game on the 30th anniversary of the fall of the Berlin Wall on 9 November 2019. Union Berlin president Dirk Zingler refused, calling the game a "football class struggle", leading to the game being played a week earlier. An 87th minute Sebastian Polter penalty secured a 1–0 win for Union; the game was temporarily suspended by referee Deniz Aytekin, following fireworks fired by Hertha fans landing amongst Union Berlin fans, as well as on the playing surface. 1,100 police officers were on duty for the game, with Hertha fans burning 1. FC Union Berlin shirts, flags and scarves during the game. The supporters of Hertha BSC had been joined by 20-25 supporters of BFC Dynamo in the guest block.  Following full time, 1. FC Union Berlin goalkeeper Rafał Gikiewicz won praise from fans and media alike after ushering Union Berlin ultras from the field of play, following a minor pitch invasion devised to attack Hertha supporters.

The second Berlin derby of the season, originally scheduled for 21 March 2020, was due to be played behind closed doors following advice from the Bundesministerium für Gesundheit, as a result of the COVID-19 pandemic in Germany but was later postponed following the Bundesliga's suspension until 2 April. On 22 May 2020, Hertha BSC played Union Berlin at the Olympiastadion behind closed doors, winning 4–0; the biggest competitive victory between the pair. In January 2022, around 80 members of Hertha BSC's Harlekins Berlin ultra group stormed Hertha's training session, threatening their players, after a second Berlin derby loss in two months against Union Berlin.

Full list of results
Includes all matches between 1. FC Union Berlin, BFC Dynamo and Hertha BSC, and other matches between all other Berlin clubs played in the 1. Bundesliga (from 1963), the 2. Bundesliga (from 1974) and the DDR-Oberliga (1949 to 1991); results listed alphabetically by main name of team, then by date. Scores list home team first in all cases.

Blau-Weiß 1890 Berlin v Hertha BSC

Blau-Weiß 1890 Berlin v Tennis Borussia Berlin

SC Charlottenburg v Hertha BSC

BFC Dynamo v 1. FC Union Berlin

Competitive (GDR)

Competitive (post-GDR)

Friendlies

BFC Dynamo v FC Vorwärts Berlin

Hertha BSC v Tennis Borussia Berlin

Hertha BSC v 1. FC Union Berlin

Competitive

Friendlies

Spandauer SV v Tennis Borussia Berlin

Spandauer SV v Wacker 04 Berlin

Tennis Borussia Berlin v Wacker 04 Berlin

1. FC Union Berlin v FC Vorwärts Berlin

See also 
 Football in Berlin

Explanatory notes

References

Hertha BSC
1. FC Union Berlin
Tennis Borussia Berlin
Berliner FC Dynamo
Association football rivalries in Germany
Football in Berlin
Sport in Berlin